At the 1948 Winter Olympics, three cross-country skiing events were contested. The 18 km competition was held on Saturday, 31 January 1948, the relay event was held on Tuesday, 3 February 1948, and the 50 km event was held on Friday, 6 February 1948.

Medal summary

Medal table

Events

Participating nations
Seven cross-country skiers competed in all three events.

A total of 106 cross-country skiers from 15 nations competed at the St. Moritz Games:

References

External links
International Olympic Committee results database

 
1948 Winter Olympics
1948 Winter Olympics events
Olympics
Cross-country skiing competitions in Switzerland